Egle Uljas (born 18 December 1984) is a retired Estonian sprinter. She competed in the women's 400 metres at the 2004 Summer Olympics.

References

External links
 

1984 births
Living people
Athletes (track and field) at the 2004 Summer Olympics
Estonian female sprinters
Olympic athletes of Estonia
Athletes from Tallinn
World Athletics Championships athletes for Estonia
Olympic female sprinters